Gach Bandi (also Romanized as Gach Bandī; also known as Gach Bandī-ye Tīzāb and Hadāīt Āleh) is a village in Mirbag-e Jonubi Rural District, in the Central District of Delfan County, Lorestan Province, Iran. At the 2006 census, its population was 128, in 29 families.

References 

Towns and villages in Delfan County